(officially stylized as Boku-no-imoutowa"Osaka-okan") is a 12-episode anime television series produced by Charaction and directed by Kōtarō Ishidate. It aired in Japan between December 21, 2012 and March 15, 2013 on BS Asahi. The series has been licensed for streaming by Crunchyroll.

Plot
Kyousuke's younger sister Namika has been living apart from him for ten years. One day, she returns and begins to live with him again, but she has turned into an energetic Osaka girl.

Characters

Media

Anime
The anime is produced by Charaction and is directed by Kōtarō Ishidate with original character designs by Sōta Sugahara. The anime is formatted as a series of shorts, with each episode being only a few minutes in length. The series aired between December 21 to March 15, 2013 on BS Asahi and was streamed by Crunchyroll. The series uses one piece of theme music, by Kana Asumi. An additional episode came bundled with the Blu-ray release of the series on April 19, 2013.

Episode list

References

External links
  
 

2012 anime television series debuts